McGalliard Falls is a waterfall in Burke County, North Carolina.

Geology
The waterfall is located on McGalliard Creek, where it flows over a large bedrock to a lower plunge pool.

Natural history

The falls is owned by the town of Valdese, North Carolina, which has built a city park around the falls.  The falls was the home to a mill called Meytre Grist Mill, which was built in 1906 by Fred Meytre.  The mill remained in operation until 1941, when Mr. Meytre became too old to operate the mill without younger men, who were being called to serve during World War II.  The mill was rebuilt in 1982 for the park.

Visiting the falls
The falls is located at McGalliard Falls Park in Valdese, North Carolina.  The park may be found by taking exit 112 off of Interstate 40 and going north to Main Street in Valdese.  Head west on Main Street for .8 miles and turn right onto Church St.  Go north 1.5 miles to the turn-in for the park on the right.  There is a short path to the falls.

Visitors should obey all rules at the park concerning the falls, and should not swim near or above the falls.

Nearby falls
High Shoals Falls
Catawba Falls
Upper Catawba Falls

References

External links
 McGalliard Falls Park

Protected areas of Burke County, North Carolina
Waterfalls of North Carolina
Parks in North Carolina
Landforms of Burke County, North Carolina